Sentinel is a dedicated conservative imprint within publisher Penguin Group (USA) and was established in 2003. It publishes a wide variety of right-of-center books on subjects like politics, history, public policy, culture, religion and international relations. Its most notable books include Donald Rumsfeld’s memoir, Known and Unknown, Mike Huckabee’s Do the Right Thing,  A Simple Christmas, and A Simple Government, and A Patriot’s History of the United States by Larry Schweikart.
 
Founder, President, and Publisher Adrian Zackheim joined Penguin Group in September 2001 to launch Portfolio, the company's business book imprint. He took on the additional role of founder and publisher of Sentinel in April 2003. He has a long track record of publishing books by notable conservatives, including Margaret Thatcher, Newt Gingrich, and Bob Dole. Before coming to Penguin Group, he was the associate publisher and editor-in-chief of HarperInformation (a division of HarperCollins) and has held various editorial positions at William Morrow, Doubleday, and St. Martin's Press.

Books
Known and Unknown by Donald Rumsfeld
George Washington’s Secret Six by Brian Kilmeade and Don Yaeger 
A Simple Government by Mike Huckabee
A Simple Christmas by Mike Huckabee
Do the Right Thing by Mike Huckabee
A Patriot’s History of the United States by Larry Schweikart
The Secret Knowledge by David Mamet
Keeping the Republic by Mitch Daniels
Can’t Is Not an Option by Nikki Haley
The Benedict Option by Rod Dreher
In Trump We Trust : E Pluribus Awesome by Ann Coulter
An American Son by Marco Rubio
The Tyranny of Clichés by Jonah Goldberg
Our Lost Constitution by Mike Lee
 Sam Houston and the Alamo Avengers: The Texas Victory That Changed American History by Brian Kilmeade
 Live Not by Lies by Rod Dreher

See also
 Threshold Editions, the conservative non-fiction imprint of Simon & Schuster
 Crown Forum, the conservative non-fiction imprint of Crown Publishing Group, a subsidiary of Random House
 Broadside Books, the conservative non-fiction imprint of HarperCollins

References

External links
 Sentinel overview at Pengium.com

Book publishing companies based in New York (state)
Pearson plc
Publishing companies established in 2003
Conservative media in the United States